Catoptria algeriensis is a moth in the family Crambidae. It was described by Johann Müller-Rutz in 1931. It is found in Algeria.

References

Crambini
Moths described in 1931
Moths of Africa